"Run and Tell That" is an R&B song in the 2002 musical Hairspray, performed by the African-American character Seaweed.

Production
The phrase "Run And Tell That" is traced back to African American religious and secular songs. Literally, it means: "to exhort someone to go quickly and give information or news to another person or persons", however in this context it is more like "declaring to your adversary you will succeed in the near future, and that he or she should let the world world know that fact". This is Seaweed's only solo song.

Synopsis
The song has Seaweed singing about black pride stating, "The blacker the berry, the sweeter the juice" and the realities associated with being marginalized by a white society.

Analysis
About.com analyses the song:

Kristi Music Lover wrote:

Critical reception
CinemaBlend said the song was "show-stopping" and "eye-popping in its energy". DemonMedia described it as a "soulful number". Reviewing the 2007 film version, FilmJournal wrote Elijah Kelley "simply sizzles in his featured number". Slate wrote it was a "group dance number".

References

Songs from Hairspray (musical)
2002 songs
Song articles with missing songwriters